The military nature of Mycenaean Greece (c. 1600–1100 BC) in the Late Bronze Age is evident by the numerous weapons unearthed, warrior and combat representations in contemporary art, as well as by the preserved Greek Linear B records. The Mycenaeans invested in the development of military infrastructure with military production and logistics being supervised directly from the palatial centres. This militaristic ethos inspired later Ancient Greek tradition, and especially Homer's epics, which are focused on the heroic nature of the Mycenaean-era warrior élite.

Late Bronze Age Greece was divided into a series of warrior kingdoms, the most important being centered in Mycenae, to which the culture of this era owes its name, Tiryns, Pylos and Thebes. From the 15th century BC, Mycenaean power started expanding towards the Aegean, the Anatolian coast and Cyprus. Mycenaean armies shared several common features with other contemporary Late Bronze Age powers: they were initially based on heavy infantry, with spears, large shields and in some occasions armor. In the 13th century BC, Mycenaean units underwent a transformation in tactics and weaponry and became more uniform and flexible and their weapons became smaller and lighter. Some representative types of Mycenaean armor/weapons were the boar's tusk helmet and the "Figure-of-eight" shield. Moreover, most features of the later hoplite panoply of Classical Greece were already known at this time.

Military ethos

The presence of the important and influential military aristocracy that formed in Mycenaean society offers an overwhelming impression of a fierce and warlike people. This impression of militarism is reinforced by the fortifications erected throughout Mycenaean Greece, the large numbers and quality of the weapons retrieved from the Mycenaean royal graves, artistic representations of war scenes and the textual evidence provided by the Linear B records. The Linear B scripts also offer some detail about the organization of the military personnel, while military production and logistics were supervised by a central authority from the palaces. According to the records in the palace of Pylos, every rural community (the damos) was obliged to supply a certain number of men who had to serve in the army; similar service was also performed by the aristocracy.

The main divinities who appear to be of warlike nature were Ares (Linear B: A-re) and Athena Potnia (Linear B: A-ta-na Po-ti-ni-ja).

Tactics and evolution

Mycenaean armies shared several common features with other significant Late Bronze Age powers: they were initially based on heavy infantry, which bore pikes, large shields and, in some occasions, armor. Later in the 13th century BC, Mycenaean warfare underwent major changes both in tactics and weaponry. Armed units became more uniform and flexible, while weapons became smaller and lighter. The spear remained the main weapon among Mycenaean warriors until the collapse of the Bronze Age, while the sword played a secondary role in combat.

The precise role and contribution of war chariots in battlefield is a matter of dispute due to the lack of sufficient evidence. In general, it appears that during the first centuries (16th–14th century BC) chariots were used as a fighting vehicle while later in the 13th century BC their role was limited to a battlefield transport. Horse-mounted warriors were also part of the Mycenaean armies, however their precise role isn't clear due to lack of archaeological data.

Fortifications

The construction of defensive structures was closely linked with the establishment of the palatial centers in mainland Greece. The principal Mycenaean centers were well-fortified and usually situated on an elevated terrain, such as in Athens, Tiryns and Mycenae or on coastal plains, in the case of Gla. Mycenaean Greeks appreciated the symbolism of war as expressed in defensive architecture, thus they aimed also at the visual impressiveness of their fortifications. The term Cyclopean was derived by the Greeks of the classical era who believed that only the mythical giants, the Cyclops, could have constructed such megalithic structures. On the other hand, cut stone masonry is used only in and around gateways.

Weaponry

Offensive weapons

During the later Mycenaean centuries, shorter versions were adopted which were usually accompanied with small types of shields, mainly of circular shape. These short spears have been used for both thrusting and throwing.

From the 16th century BC, swords with rounded tips appeared, having a grip which was an extension of the blade. Another type, the single-edged sword was a solid piece of bronze c. – long. This shorter sword was most probably used for close-quarters combat. In the 14th century BC, both types were progressively modified with stronger grips and shorter blades. Finally in the 13th century BC, a new type of sword, the Naue II, became popular in Mycenaean Greece.

Archery was commonly used from an early period in battlefield. Other offensive weapons used were maces, axes, slings and javelins.

Shields

Early Mycenaean armies used "tower shields", large shields that covered almost the entire body. However, with the introduction of bronze armor, this type was less utilized, even if it didn't completely go into disuse, as attested in iconography. "Figure-of-eight" shields became the most common type of Mycenaean shields. These shields were made of several layers of bull-hide and in some cases they were reinforced with bronze plates. During the later Mycenaean period, smaller types of shields were adopted. They were either of completely circular shape, or almost circular with a cut-out part from their lower edge. These were made of several layers of leather with a bronze boss and reinforcements. They occasionally appear to have been made entirely of bronze.In the later Mycenaean culture, armies used "crescent shields" which were used on horseback as they curved around the body of a horse being ridden, but covered much of the rider's body.

Helmets
The most common type of Mycenaean helmet is the conical one reinforced with rows of boar tusks. This type was widely used and became the most identifiable piece of Mycenaean armor, being in use from the beginning to the collapse of Mycenaean culture. It is also known from several depictions in contemporary art in Greece and the Mediterranean. Boar's tusk helmets consisted of a felt-lined leather cap, with several rows of cut boar's tusk sewn onto it.

Helmets made entirely of bronze were also used, while some of them had large cheek guards, probably stitched or riveted to the helmet, as well as an upper pierced knot to hold a crest. Small holes all around the cheek guards and the helmet's lower edge were used for the attachment of internal padding. Other types of bronze helmets were also used. During the late Mycenaean period, additional types were also used such as horned helmets made of strips of leather.

Armour

A representative piece of Mycenaean armor is the Dendra panoply (c. 1450–1400 BC) which consisted of a cuirass of a complete set made up of several elements of bronze. It was flexible and comfortable enough to be used for fighting on foot, while the total weight of the armor is around 18 kg (about 40 lb). Important evidence of Mycenaean armor has also been found in Thebes (c. 1350–1250 BC), which include a pair of shoulder guards, smaller than those from Dendra, with additional plates protecting the upper arms, attached to the lower edge of the shoulder guards.

The use of scale armour is evident during the later Mycenaean centuries, as shown on iconography and archaeological finds. In general, most features of the later hoplite panoply of classical Greek antiquity, were already known to Mycenaean Greece.

Chariots

The two-horse chariot appeared on the Greek mainland at least from the 16th century BC. Mycenaean chariots differed from their counterparts used by contemporary Middle Eastern powers. According to the preserved Linear B records, the palatial states of Knossos and Pylos were able to field several hundreds. The most common type of Mycenaean chariot was the "dual chariot", which appeared in the middle of the 15th century BC. In 14th century BC, a lighter version appeared, the "rail chariot", which featured an open cab and was most probably used as a battlefield transport rather than a fighting vehicle.

Ships
Mycenaean ships were shallow-draught vessels and could be beached on sandy bays. There were vessels of various sizes containing different numbers of oarsmen. The largest ship probably had a crew of 42–46 oarsmen, with one steering oar, a captain, two attendants and a complement of warriors.

The most common type of Mycenaean vessel based on depictions of contemporary art was the oared galley with long and narrow hulls. The shape of the hull was constructed in a way to maximize the number of rowers. Thus, a higher speed could have been achieved regardless of wind conditions. Although it carried mast and sail, it was less efficient as a sailing ship. The Mycenaean galley offered certain advantages. Although lighter compared to the oared-sailing ship of the Minoans of Crete, it seated more rowers. Its steering mechanism was a triangular steering oar, a forerunner of the latter steering oar of Archaic era.

Campaigns
Around 1450 BC, Greece was divided into a series of warrior kingdoms, the most important being centered in Mycenae, Tiryns, Pylos and Thebes. Before the end of the same century, this militaristic civilization replaced the former civilization of Minoan Cretans in the Aegean. Thus, the Mycenaeans began to build up their maritime power in the Aegean Sea, expanding towards the Aegean Islands and Anatolian coast. The warlike nature of the Mycenaeans was probably a decisive factor in their diplomatic relations towards the other Late Bronze Age powers. Mycenaean warriors were also hired as mercenaries in foreign armies, such as in Egypt.

Contemporary Hittite texts indicate the presence of Ahhiyawa, which strengthened its position in western Anatolia from c. 1400 to c. 1220 BC. Ahhiyawa is generally accepted as a Hittite translation of Mycenaean Greece (Achaeans in Homeric Greek). During this period, the kings of Ahhiyawa were clearly able to deal with the Hittite kings both in a military and diplomatic way. Ahhiyawa activity was to interfere in Anatolian affairs, with the support of anti-Hittite uprisings or through local vassal rulers, which the king of the Ahhiyawa used as agents for the extension of his influence. In one occasion, in c. 1400 BC, Attarsiya (a possible Hittite translation of Atreus) launched a campaign deploying an army headed by war chariots and attacked regions which were under Hittite influence. Later, Attarsiya, invaded the island of Alashiya (Cyprus) together with a number of his Anatolian allies. The invading force finally succeeded in controlling the island and overthrowing the local Hittite authorities. The campaigns of Attarsiya represent the earliest recorded Mycenaean Greek military activity against the Hittites. The Hittite-Ahhiyawan confrontation in Wilusa, the Hittite name for Troy, in the 13th century BC may have provided the historical foundation for the Trojan War tradition.

In circa 1250 BC, the first wave of destruction has been witnessed in various centers of mainland Greece for reasons that cannot be identified by archaeologists. These incidents appear to have triggered the massive strengthening and expansion of the fortifications in various sites. In some cases, arrangements were also made for the creation of subterranean passages which led to underground cisterns. Nevertheless, none of these measures appear to have prevented the final destruction of the Mycenaean palace centers in the 12th century BC. The reasons that lead to the collapse of the Mycenaean culture have been hotly debated among scholars. The two most common theories are population movement and internal conflict.

Legacy
Due to the information offered by the Greek epics and especially by Homer's Iliad and Odyssey, this time period of Greek history was regarded as a period of warrior-heroes who led various military campaigns in Greece and adjacent areas. The picture of the Mycenaean Greeks in the Homeric Epics is one of a quarrelsome people and of a warrior élite to whom personal honor was the highest value.

See also
Ancient Greek warfare
Bronze Age sword

References

Citations

Sources

Military history of ancient Greece
Mycenaean Greece